Ranelagh Bridge Yard was a locomotive stabling point located near London Paddington station.

History 
Before its closure in 1980, Class 31, 47, 50 and 52 locomotives could be seen at the depot.

References 
 

 Railway depots in England